James Bernard Driscoll (born May 14, 1944 in Medford, Massachusetts) is a former Major League Baseball second baseman and shortstop who played in two seasons with the Oakland Athletics and Texas Rangers. He batted left-handed and threw right-handed.

Playing career
Driscoll was drafted by the Milwaukee Braves as an amateur free agent in June . That November, he was drafted by the Kansas City Athletics in the 1962 first-year draft.

He began the  season with the Triple-A Iowa Oaks then was acquired by the Washington Senators during that season. The Senators assigned him to the Triple-A Denver Bears, where he spent the remainder of the 1971 season.

The following season, the Senators moved to Arlington, Texas and became the Texas Rangers. Driscoll appeared in 15 games with the Rangers in their inaugural season in Arlington, but he spent most of the season in Denver. Following the 1972 season he was traded to the Cincinnati Reds along with Hal King in exchange for Jim Merritt. He played in the Reds and later the Houston Astros minor league systems but never appeared in a major league game for either club. He retired after the  season at age 31.

External links

1944 births
Living people
Baltimore Orioles scouts
Birmingham Barons players
Baseball players from Massachusetts
Burlington Bees players
Denver Bears players
Dublin Braves players
Indianapolis Indians players
Iowa Oaks players
Lewiston Broncs players
Major League Baseball second basemen
Major League Baseball shortstops
Mobile A's players
Oakland Athletics players
Sportspeople from Medford, Massachusetts
Texas Rangers players
Trois-Rivières Aigles players
Vancouver Mounties players